Sydney Carey Ellis (16 August 1931 – 2001) was an English footballer who played as a full back in the Football League.

References

External links

1931 births
2001 deaths
English footballers
Footballers from Charlton, London
Association football defenders
Charlton Athletic F.C. players
Brighton & Hove Albion F.C. players
Guildford City F.C. players
English Football League players
England under-23 international footballers